The Johnson House is a historic house at 516 East 8th Street in Little Rock, Arkansas.  It is a -story American Foursquare house, with a hip roof that has a projecting cross-gable section at the front.  A single-story porch extends across the front, supported by Tuscan columns.  The house was built about 1900 to a design by the noted Arkansas architect Charles L. Thompson, and is one of a group of three similar houses intended as rental properties.

The house was listed on the National Register of Historic Places in 1982.

See also
Johnson House (514 East 8th Street, Little Rock, Arkansas)
Johnson House (518 East 8th Street, Little Rock, Arkansas)
National Register of Historic Places listings in Little Rock, Arkansas

References

Houses on the National Register of Historic Places in Arkansas
Colonial Revival architecture in Arkansas
Houses completed in 1910
Houses in Little Rock, Arkansas
National Register of Historic Places in Little Rock, Arkansas
Historic district contributing properties in Arkansas